Aulanko Nature Reserve is a nature reserve in Finland near the municipality of Hämeenlinna. It is a part of Finland's National Urban Park policy introduced in the Land Use and Building Act in 1991.

See also
 Aulanko Castle

References

Parks in Finland